Glass Beach may refer to:

Glass Beach (Benicia, California)
Glass Beach (Fort Bragg, California)
Glass Beach (Eleele, Hawaii)
Glass Beach (band)
Glass Beach (Russia)